Jhano Hansdah (born ) is an Indian female compound archer and part of the national team. She competed at the 2013 World Archery Championships.

References

1975 births
Living people
Indian female archers
Place of birth missing (living people)
Archers at the 2010 Commonwealth Games
Commonwealth Games medallists in archery
Commonwealth Games bronze medallists for India
21st-century Indian women
21st-century Indian people
Medallists at the 2010 Commonwealth Games